The 8th Screen Actors Guild Awards, honoring the best achievements in film and television performances for the year 2001, took place on March 10, 2002. The ceremony was held at the Shrine Exposition Center in Los Angeles, California and was televised live by TNT.

The nominees were announced on January 29, 2002 by Marisa Tomei and Ted Danson at Los Angeles' Pacific Design Center's SilverScreen Theatre.

Winners and nominees
Winners are listed first and highlighted in boldface.

Screen Actors Guild Life Achievement Award
 Edward Asner

Film

Television

In Memoriam 
Performers and members of the Guild who had died the previous year that were honored in the ceremony's In Memoriam tribute:

 Aaliyah
 Imogene Coca
 Perry Como
 Dagmar
 Rosemary DeCamp
 Troy Donahue
 Gloria Foster
 Arlene Francis
 Kathleen Freeman
 David Graf
 Jane Greer
 Anne Haney
 George Harrison
 Nigel Hawthorne
 Eileen Heckart
 Christopher Hewett
 Peggy Lee
 Jack Lemmon
 Whitman Mayo
 Dorothy McGuire
 Jason Miller
 Carroll O'Connor
 Anthony Quinn
 Avery Schreiber
 Ann Sothern
 Kim Stanley
 Guy Stockwell
 Beatrice Straight
 Edward Winter
 Victor Wong

References

External links
 The 8th Annual Screen Actors Guild Awards

2001
2001 film awards
2001 television awards
Screen
Screen Actors Guild
Screen
March 2002 events in the United States
2001 guild awards